John Paul Zimmerman (19 February 1918 – 2 September 1944) was an Australian rules footballer who played with Footscray in the Victorian Football League (VFL).

Sources

Holmesby, Russell & Main, Jim (2007). The Encyclopedia of AFL Footballers. 7th ed. Melbourne: Bas Publishing.
Jack Zimmerman's obituary

1918 births
1944 deaths
Military personnel from Melbourne
Australian rules footballers from Melbourne
Western Bulldogs players
Australian Army personnel of World War II
Australian Army soldiers
Australian military personnel killed in World War II
People from Footscray, Victoria